The Cochrane Crunch are a Canadian junior ice hockey team based out of Cochrane, Ontario, Canada.  They play in the Northern Ontario Junior Hockey League and are former members of the Greater Metro Junior A Hockey League.  The team was known as the Elliot Lake Bobcats in Elliot Lake, Ontario, until the 2014–15 season.

History
The expansion of the Bobcats made them the tenth team in the independent Greater Metro Junior A Hockey League (GMHL) and one of six 2007 expansion teams. The Bobcats were Elliot Lake's first Junior "A" team since the folding of the Elliot Lake Ice in 1999. On September 7, 2007, the Elliot Lake Bobcats played their first game, at home, against the Espanola Kings.  The Bobcats also picked up their first win as they defeated the Kings 3–2.

On January 1, 2008, the Bobcats hosted the Moscow Selects All-star team in an exhibition game.  The Selects won the game by a score of 9–2.  This was the third game of seven that the Moscow team played against different GMHL clubs. The Bobcats played against Kazakhstan's Torpedo UST-Kamenogorsk Under-18 squad on January 8, 2009, in an international exhibition game. The Bobcats won the game 5–3.

In mid-January 2011, it was announced that the town of Iron Bridge, Ontario, and its 500-seat outdoor arena would host a regular season game, known as the North Shore Winter Classic, between the Elliot Lake Bobcats and Algoma Avalanche on January 29, 2011.  This is the first known regulation outdoor game in Ontario in the modern era.  Elliot Lake won the game 8–2 in front of an estimated 400 fans.

On April 2, 2011, the Bobcats won the 2011 Russell Cup Championship over the South Muskoka Shield 4-games-to-3 with an 8–5 victory. The Bobcats were down 3-games-to-1 in the series, but came back with three straight victories to win their first league title. The Bobcats are the first GMHL team that did not participate in the inaugural 2006–07 season to win the Russell Cup.

In 2011–12, the Bobcats finished fifth in the GMHL. The Bobcats played the Bobcaygeon Bucks in the first round of the playoffs and defeated the Bucks 2-games-to-1. In the league quarter-final, their season ended losing 3-games-to-1 to the South Muskoka Shield.

In April 2012, the Elliot Lake Bobcats became members of the Northern Ontario Junior Hockey League, leaving the GMHL after five seasons, two regular season titles, and winning the 2011 championship. On September 7, 2012, the Bobcats played their first game in the NOJHL.  They played the North Bay Trappers and lost 8–0. On September 21, 2012 the Bobcats won their first NOJHL game 6–2 over the Blind River Beavers.

The Bobcats moved to Cochrane, Ontario, for the 2014–15 NOJHL season and became the Cochrane Crunch. In April 2015, the Crunch qualified for the league finals by sweeping the Powassan Voodoos in four games to become East Division champions.

On March 1, 2018, the NOJHL announced that the Crunch would host the 2019 Dudley Hewitt Cup, their first time hosting the Central Canadian Junior A championship tournament. On April 24, 2018, the Crunch defeated the Rayside-Balfour Canadians for the NOJHL championship and made their first appearance in a Dudley Hewitt Cup tournament. They finished without a win the round-robin portion of the 2018 tournament.

In August 2020, Ryan Leonard sold the Crunch to former Ontario Hockey League player Tom Nickolau.

Season-by-season standings

Playoffs
2008 Lost Semi-final
Elliot Lake Bobcats defeated Nipissing Alouettes 4-games-to-1 in bye round
Elliot Lake Bobcats defeated Deseronto Storm 4-games-to-2 in quarter-final
Bradford Rattlers defeated Elliot Lake Bobcats 4-games-to-none in semi-final
2009 Lost Division Final
Elliot Lake Bobcats defeated Minden Riverkings 3-games-to-none in division quarter-final
Received a bye through Division Semi-final
South Muskoka Shield defeated Elliot Lake Bobcats 4-games-to-1 in division final
2010 Lost Semi-final
Elliot Lake Bobcats defeated Algoma Avalanche 3-games-to-none in quarter-final
Deseronto Storm defeated Elliot Lake Bobcats 4-games-to-2 in semi-final
2011 Won League
Elliot Lake Bobcats defeated Powassan Dragons 3-games-to-none in quarter-final
Elliot Lake Bobcats defeated Toronto Canada Moose 4-games-to-none in semi-final
Elliot Lake Bobcats defeated South Muskoka Shield 4-games-to-3 in final
2012 Lost Quarter-final
Elliot Lake Bobcats defeated Bobcaygeon Bucks 2-games-to-1 in bye round
South Muskoka Shield defeated Elliot Lake Bobcats 3-games-to-1 in quarter-final
2013 Lost Quarter-final
Sudbury Nickel Barons defeated Elliot Lake Bobcats 4-games-to-3 in quarter-final
2014 Lost Quarter-final
Abitibi Eskimos defeated Elliot Lake Bobcats 4-games-to-3 in quarter-final

Dudley Hewitt Cup
Central Canada Jr. A ChampionshipsNOJHL – OJHL – SIJHL – HostRound-robin play with 2nd vs. 3rd in semifinal to advance against 1st in the finals.

Retired numbers
22 – Dustin Cordeiro
74 – Connor Lovie

References

External links
Cochrane Crunch Webpage

Ice hockey teams in Ontario
Cochrane, Ontario
Sport in Northern Ontario
2007 establishments in Ontario
Ice hockey clubs established in 2007